Roman Smutný (born 22 April 1985) is a Czech footballer who plays for SK Hanácká Slavia Kroměříž.

Career
Smutný began playing football for FK Drnovice, making 11 Gambrinus liga appearances for club. He joined 1. FC Brno in 2005, making 15 top flight appearances for the club before leaving in 2010. He also had a loan spell at SK Kladno during the 2008–09 Gambrinus liga season.

External links

Guardian Football

1985 births
Living people
Czech footballers
Czech First League players
FC Zbrojovka Brno players
SK Kladno players
FK Drnovice players
Association football midfielders